First-magnitude stars are the brightest stars in the night sky, with apparent magnitudes lower (i.e. brighter) than +1.50. Hipparchus, in the 1st century BC, introduced the magnitude scale. He allocated the first magnitude to the 20 brightest stars and the sixth magnitude to the faintest stars visible to the naked eye.

In the 19th century, this ancient scale of apparent magnitude was logarithmically defined, so that a star of magnitude 1.00 is exactly 100 times as bright as one of 6.00. The scale was also extended to even brighter celestial bodies such as Sirius (-1.5), Venus (-4), the full Moon (-12.7), and the Sun (-26.7).

Hipparchus 
Hipparchus ranked his stars in a very simple way. He listed the brightest stars as "of the first magnitude", which meant "the biggest." Stars less bright Hipparchus called "of the second magnitude", or second biggest. The faintest stars visible to the naked eye he called "of the sixth magnitude".

Naked-eye magnitude system
During a series of lectures given in 1736 at the University of Oxford, its then Professor of Astronomy explainedː

The fixed Stars appear to be of different bignesses, not because they really are so, but because they are not all equally distant from us. Those that are nearest will excel in Lustre and Bigness; the more remote Stars will give a fainter Light, and appear smaller to the Eye. Hence arise the Distribution of Stars, according to their Order and Dignity, into Classes; the first Class containing those which are nearest to us, are called Stars of the first Magnitude; those that are next to them, are Stars of the second Magnitude ... and so forth, 'till we come to the Stars of the sixth Magnitude, which comprehend the smallest Stars that can be discerned with the bare Eye. For all the other Stars, which are only seen by the Help of a Telescope [...]

And even among those Stars which are reckoned of the brightest Class, there appears a Variety of Magnitude; for Sirius or Arcturus are each of them brighter than Aldebaran [...] And there are some Stars of such an intermedial Order, that the Astronomers have differed in classing of them; some putting the same Stars in one Class, others in another. For Example: The little Dog was by Tycho placed among the Stars of the second Magnitude, which Ptolemy reckoned among the Stars of the first Class [...]

Distribution on the Sky 
In the modern scale, the 20 brightest stars of Hipparchos have magnitudes between -1.5 (Sirius) and +1.6 (Bellatrix, γ Orionis). The table below shows 22 stars brighter than +1.5 mag, but 5 of them the Greek astronomers probably didn't know for their far southern position.

Epsilon Canis Majoris has an apparent magnitude of almost exactly 1.5, so it may be considered a first magnitude sometimes due to minor variations.

Twelve of the 22 brightest stars are on the actual Northern sky, ten on Southern sky. But on the seasonal evening sky, they are unevenly distributed: In Europe and USA 12–13 stars are visible in winter, but only 6–7 in summer. Nine of the brightest winter stars are part of the Winter Hexagon or surrounded by it.

Table of the 22 first-magnitude stars 
 (18 of them visible in Hipparchos' Greece)

First-magnitude deep-sky objects 
Beside stars there are also deep-sky objects that are first-magnitude objects, accumulatively brighter than +1.50, such as the Large Magellanic Cloud, Milky Way, Carina Nebula, Hyades, Pleiades and the Alpha Persei Cluster (with Eta Carinae, Aldebaran, Alcyone and Mirfak as the brightest stars of the latter four).

See also 
 Absolute magnitude
 List of brightest stars

Literature 
 Jeffrey Bennett et al., 2010: Astronomie. Die kosmische Perspektive (Ed. Harald Lesch), Chapter 15.1 (p. 735–737). Pearson Studium Verlag, München, 
 H.Bernhard, D.Bennett, H.Rice, 1948: New Handbook of the Heavens, Chapter 5 (Stars of the Southern Sky). MaGraw-Hill, New York
 Patrick Moore, 1996: Brilliant Stars Cassell Publishers Limited 
 James. B Kahler, "First Magnitude: A Book of the Bright Sky". World Scientific, 2013. 239 pages. , 9789814417426

References

Stellar astronomy
Observational astronomy
Photometry